Bid Zard-e Sofla (also Romanized as Bīd Zard-e Soflá; also known as Bīd-i-Zard, Bīd Zard, and Bīd Zard-e Pā’īn) is a village in Bid Zard Rural District, in the Central District of Shiraz County, Fars Province, Iran. At the 2016 census, its population was 2,354, in 551 families. The Villiage is mainly populated with the family name Bayat.

References 

Populated places in Shiraz County